Gregory Vincent Cundle (born 20 March 1997) is an English footballer who plays as a forward for Ebbsfleet United. Previously of Gillingham, he has spent time at non-league clubs East Grinstead Town, Tilbury, Margate, Billericay Town, Bishop's Stortford, Kingstonian and Horsham.

Club career
A graduate of Gillingham's youth setup, Cundle signed a one-year professional contract with the club in the summer of 2015. In the 2015–16 season, he had spells on loan at East Grinstead Town of the Isthmian League South Division, for whom he scored 11 goals in all competitions, 8 in the league; at Tilbury, for whom he scored twice in seven Isthmian League North Division matches in February 2016; and at Margate, for whom he scored once in five National League South matches in March. The goal came on his first appearance, in a 3–1 defeat against Maidenhead United.

After a loan deal with Billericay Town from 31 August to 28 October 2016 during which he scored four times, he joined Bishop's Stortford, again on loan, on 22 December. He was recalled by Gillingham in early March 2017, and made his English Football League debut on 18 March in a 4–1 defeat away to Rochdale in League One.

In May 2017, he accepted Gillingham's offer of a one-year contract extension. On 7 November 2017 he scored his first goal for Gillingham in the Football League Trophy against Reading U21s.

Following his release from Gillingham, he enjoyed spells with Kingstonian and East Grinstead Town before a move to National League South side, Concord Rangers in May 2019. 

On 2 January 2020, Cundle moved to Horsham.

On 7 September 2020, Cundle moved to National League South side Ebbsfleet United.

Career statistics

References

External links

1997 births
Living people
Association football forwards
English footballers
Gillingham F.C. players
East Grinstead Town F.C. players
Tilbury F.C. players
Margate F.C. players
Billericay Town F.C. players
Bishop's Stortford F.C. players
Kingstonian F.C. players
Concord Rangers F.C. players
Horsham F.C. players
Ebbsfleet United F.C. players
Isthmian League players
National League (English football) players
English Football League players